Yunqi may refer to:

Yunki (1680–1732), Prince Hengwen of the First Rank, Kangxi Emperor's son
Yunqi (1714–1785), Prince Cheng of the Third Rank, Kangxi Emperor's son